Edward Lloyd "Ed" Salmon, Junior (January 30, 1934 – June 29, 2016) was an American bishop in The Episcopal Church.

Biography 
Born in Natchez, Mississippi, he received his bachelor's degree from the University of the South and a bachelor's degree in theology from Virginia Theological Seminary. In 1961, he was ordained a priest for the Diocese of Arkansas in The Episcopal Church. From 1990 to 2008, he served as bishop of the Diocese of South Carolina. He was a noted conservative who remained in the Episcopal Church, unlike his former diocese.

He was a member of Communion Partners, an Episcopalian group which opposed the 77th General Episcopal Convention's decision to authorize the blessing of same-sex marriages in 2012. The measure to allow the blessing of same-sex unions won by a 111–41 vote with 3 abstentions.

He chaired the board of The Anglican Digest for 41 years. After retiring from his episcopal see, Salmon served as the dean of Nashotah House Theological Seminary in Wisconsin.

References

1934 births
2016 deaths
Episcopal bishops of South Carolina
Nashotah House faculty
People from Natchez, Mississippi
People from Waukesha County, Wisconsin
Religious leaders from Wisconsin
Sewanee: The University of the South alumni
Virginia Theological Seminary alumni
20th-century Anglican bishops in the United States
21st-century Anglican bishops in the United States
Anglican realignment people